Tomasz Jakimczuk (born 17 March 1978) is a Polish para table tennis player. He competed at the 2020 Summer Paralympics, winning a bronze medal. 

He competed at the 2018 China Para Open, winning a gold medal.

References

External links 
 JAKIMCZUK Tomasz (ipttc.org)

1978 births
Living people
People from Żagań
Paralympic table tennis players of Poland
Medalists at the 2020 Summer Paralympics
Table tennis players at the 2020 Summer Paralympics
Paralympic medalists in table tennis
Polish male table tennis players